The Miralga Creek mine is an iron ore mine operated by Atlas Iron and located in the Pilbara region of Western Australia,  south-east from Port Hedland. Ore from the mine is transported overland via road train to the Utah Point Bulk Commodities Berth at Port Hedland.

Overview

The new mine utilises existing infrastructure of the former mine, specifically the camp and bore fields. Mining is to be conducted in five open pits, spread over three areas, with the crushed ore then transported by road train to the Utah Point Bulk Commodities Berth at Port Hedland.

The mine is scheduled to operate for around four years and to produce  of iron ore in this time. Construction at the mine started in July 2021, and commenced mining in late February 2022, slightly ahead of schedule.

Part of the mining operations will be carried out by a company operated by the traditional owners of the region, the Nyamal people.

References

External links
 Atlas Iron Limited website
 MINEDEX website: Miralga Creek Database of the Department of Mines, Industry Regulation and Safety

Atlas Iron
Iron ore mines in Western Australia
Surface mines in Australia
Shire of East Pilbara
2022 establishments in Australia